Dick Cadwalader is a pioneering American gasser drag racer.

Driving an Oldsmobile-powered 1933 Ford, Cadwalader won NHRA's first ever A/G national title, at Great Bend, Kansas, in 1955. (His elapsed time was not recorded or has not been preserved.)

Notes

Sources
Davis, Larry. Gasser Wars, North Branch, MN:  Cartech, 2003, p.180.

Dragster drivers
American racing drivers
Possibly living people
Year of birth missing